There have been two baronetcies created for persons with the surname Hawley, one in the Baronetage of England and one in the Baronetage of Great Britain.

The Hawley Baronetcy, of Buckland in the County of Somerset, was created in the Baronetage of England on 14 March 1644. For more information on this creation, see Baron Hawley.

The Hawley Baronetcy, of Leybourne Grange in the County of Kent, was created in the Baronetage of Great Britain on 14 March 1795 for Henry Hawley. The third Baronet who served as High Sheriff of Kent in 1844 was succeeded by his brother. The fifth Baronet was the nephew of both the 3rd and 4th Baronets, and the son of Rev Henry Charles Hawley, Rector of Leybourne. The sixth Baronet died without issue and was succeeded by his nephew who was High Sheriff of Lincolnshire in 1962. The eighth Baronet, who did not use his title, had not attempted to prove his succession and was therefore not on the Official Roll of the Baronetage, with the baronetcy considered dormant since 1988. The baronetcy became extinct on his death in 2015.


Hawley baronets, of Buckland (1644)

 See Baron Hawley

Hawley baronets, of Leybourne Grange (1795)

 Sir Henry Hawley, 1st Baronet (1745–1826)
 Sir Henry Hawley, 2nd Baronet (1776–1831)
 Sir Joseph Henry Hawley, 3rd Baronet (1814–1875)
 Sir Henry James Hawley, 4th Baronet (1815–1898)
 Sir Henry Michael Hawley, 5th Baronet (1848–1909)
 Sir Henry Cusack Wingfield Hawley, 6th Baronet (1876–1923)
 Sir David Henry Hawley, 7th Baronet (1913–1988)
 Sir Henry Nicholas Hawley, 8th Baronet (1939–2015)

References

Sources
 Kidd, Charles, Williamson, David (editors). Debrett's Peerage and Baronetage (1990 edition). New York: St Martin's Press, 1990, 
 

Hawley
Hawley
1644 establishments in England
1795 establishments in Great Britain